Triangle is a 2009 South Korean-Japanese comedy film starring Ahn Jae-wook, Kang Hye-jung and Lee Soo-kyung. A tense standoff between a wealthy young widow with a collection of world-famous art, a swindler with an eye on her collection, and a strange woman who blackmails him into including her in the con.

It was part of the "Telecinema7" project, seven feature-length mini-dramas which were collaborations between South Korean TV directors and Japanese TV screenwriters; the seven Korea-Japan joint productions both received a limited theater release and were broadcast on television. Triangle was first released in Korea in CGV theaters on November 29, 2009, and later aired on SBS (South Korea) and TV Asahi (Japan) in 2010.

Plot
Ji-young is a beautiful widow of an extremely wealthy family who finds herself attracted to Sang-woo, whom she meets at a ski resort. Sang-woo is the CEO of a company that arranges art exhibitions, and Ji-young finds him different from the gold diggers who usually come on to her. She starts opening up to him, because he is gentle-natured and seems to be rich enough not to want her for her money. But actually, Sang-woo is a con artist who only has  left to his name. His attempts are thwarted each time by a woman named Sung-hye who always appears right before he is about to make a crucial move. She claims to be Ji-young's batchmate from high school, but Ji-young doesn't remember her at all. Sang-woo is suspicious of Sung-hye and follows her, only to have his cover blown. Sung-hye had, in fact, been targeting Sang-woo. He panics but is surprised when she proposes that he let her in on his scam to steal "Galatea's Tears."

Cast
Ahn Jae-wook - Ryu Sang-woo 
Kang Hye-jung - Oh Sung-hye 
Lee Soo-kyung - Han Ji-young 
Kang Shin-il - Vice President Son
Lee Dae-yeon - Section Chief Kim
Lee Sung-min - CEO Lee Byung-joon
Heo Jung-gyu - Detective Won
Park Jin-young - butler
Cha Tae-hyun (cameo)

See also
The Relation of Face, Mind and Love
Heaven's Postman
19-Nineteen
Paradise
After the Banquet
A Dream Comes True

References

External links
 https://web.archive.org/web/20130624215141/http://telecinema7.jp/ 
 http://cafe.naver.com/telecine7/ 
 
 
 Triangle at the Internet Movie Database

2000s Korean-language films
Japanese comedy films
South Korean comedy films
2009 films
2000s South Korean films